Anastasiia Sergeyevna Silanteva (born 27 August 1998) is a Russian alpine skier. She competed in the women's giant slalom at the 2018 Winter Olympics.

References

1998 births
Living people
Russian female alpine skiers
Olympic alpine skiers of Russia
Alpine skiers at the 2018 Winter Olympics
Place of birth missing (living people)
Universiade gold medalists for Russia
Universiade bronze medalists for Russia
Universiade medalists in alpine skiing
Competitors at the 2017 Winter Universiade
Alpine skiers at the 2016 Winter Youth Olympics